The four-leaf clover is a rare variation of the common three-leaf clover. According to traditional sayings, such clovers bring good luck, though it is not clear when or how this idea began. One early mention of "Fower-leafed or purple grasse" is from 1640 and simply says that it was kept in gardens because it was "good for the purples in children or others".

Occurrence
Four-leaf clovers have a frequency of approximately 1 in 5000, according to a 2017 survey of approximately 7 million clovers conducted by Lidia and Uli Sperling of the website Share the Luck. The same survey found that the frequency of five-leaf clovers is 1 in 24,400, and of six-leaf clovers is 1 in 312,500.

Even so, this probability has not deterred collectors who have reached records as high as 160,000 four-leaf clovers in a lifetime. The world record for number of four-leaf clovers collected in one hour is 166, set by American Katie Borka on June 23, 2018.

Clovers can have more than four leaves. Five-leaf clovers are less commonly found naturally than four-leaf clovers; however, they, too, have been successfully cultivated. Some four-leaf clover collectors, particularly in Ireland, regard the five-leaf clover, known as a rose clover, as a particular prize. The most leaves ever found on a single clover stem (Trifolium repens L.) is 56 and was discovered by Shigeo Obara of Hanamaki, Iwate, Japan, on 10 May 2009.

Cause

It is debated whether the fourth leaf is caused genetically or environmentally. Its relative rarity (1 in 5,000 clovers) suggests a possible recessive gene appearing at a low frequency. Alternatively, four-leaf clovers could be caused by somatic mutation or a developmental error of environmental causes. They could also be caused by the interaction of several genes that happen to segregate in the individual plant. It is possible all four explanations could apply to individual cases. This means that multiple four-leaf clovers could be found in the same cloverplant.

Researchers from the University of Georgia have reported finding the gene that turns ordinary three-leaf clovers into the coveted four-leaf types. Masked by the three-leaf gene and strongly influenced by environmental condition, molecular markers now make it possible to detect the presence of the gene for four-leaves and for breeders to work with it. The results of the study, which also located two other leaf traits in the white-clover genome, were reported in the July/August 2010 edition of Crop Science, published by the Crop Science Society of America.

The other leaf traits, the red fleck mark and red midrib, a herringbone pattern that streaks down the center of each leaflet in a bold red color, were mapped to nearby locations, resolving a century-old question as to whether these leaf traits were controlled by one gene or two separate genes.

White clover has many genes that affect leaf color and shape, and the three in the study were very rare. These traits can be quite attractive, particularly if combined with others, and can turn clover into an ornamental plant for use in flower beds.

There are reports of farms in the US which specialize in four-leaf clovers, producing as many as 10,000 a day (to be sealed in plastic as "lucky charms") by introducing a genetically engineered ingredient to the plants to encourage the aberration (there are, however, widely available cultivars that regularly produce leaves with multiple leaflets – see below).

Multi-leaved cultivars

There are some cultivars of white clover (Trifolium repens) which regularly produce more than three leaflets, including purple-leaved T. repens "Purpurascens Quadrifolium" and green-leaved T. repens "Quadrifolium". Some clovers have more spade shape leaves, rather than the usual rounded ones. This may be a genetic mutation. Some genetic mutations in clovers include spade-like shaped leaves or a dotted rusty colour on the leaves.

Trifolium repens "Good Luck" is a cultivar which has three, four, or five green, dark-centered leaflets per leaf.

Other species
Other plants may be mistaken for, or misleadingly sold as, "four-leaf clovers"; for example, Oxalis tetraphylla is a species of wood sorrel with leaves resembling a four-leaf clover. Other species that have been sold as "four-leaf clovers" include Marsilea quadrifolia.

As a good luck charm
A description from 1869 says that four-leaf clovers were "gathered at night-time during the full moon by sorceresses, who mixed it with vervain and other ingredients, while young girls in search of a token of perfect happiness made quest of the plant by day".

In an 1877 letter to St.Nicholas Magazine, an 11-year-old girl, who wrote, "Did the fairies ever whisper in your ear, that a four-leaf clover brought good luck to the finder?"

Symbolic usage

 Italian automobile maker Alfa Romeo uses a quadrifoglio (four-leaf clover) icon to delineate its racing cars and performance-oriented road models. This tradition started in the 1923 Targa Florio race, when driver Ugo Sivocci decorated his car with a green clover on a white background. As of 2022, the quadrifoglio is used on the company's race liveries.
 Los Angeles-based space exploration company SpaceX includes a four-leaf clover on each space mission embroidered patch as a good luck charm. Inclusion of the clover has become a regular icon on SpaceX's flight patches ever since the company's first successful Falcon 1 rocket launch in 2008, which was the first mission to feature a clover "for luck" on its patch.
 Celtic Football Club, an association football team from Glasgow, Scotland, have used the four leaf clover as the club's official badge for over 40 years.
 Former Japanese game developer studio Clover Studio used a four-leaf clover as their logo.
 Several businesses and organisations use a four-leaf clover in their logos to signify Celtic origins.
 The global network of youth organizations 4-H uses a green four-leaf clover with a white H on each leaf.
 The logo of the New Jersey Lottery features an outline of the state in white on a green four-leaf clover printed on a lottery draw machine ball.
 The English-language imageboard 4chan features a four-leaf clover in its logo, deriving from the manga character Yotsuba Koiwai's quadruple green pigtails and the similar pronunciation of 4chan and fortune.
 Traditional symbol of agrarian parties popularized by Republican Party of Farmers and Peasants, Bulgarian Agrarian National Union, People's Party and International Agrarian Bureau in interwar period. Used until today among others by Polish People's Party, Estonian Centre Party and Nordic agrarian parties.
In Japan, the Green Cars of Shinkansen use a four-leaf clover logo.

Meanings
Some folk traditions assign a different attribute to each leaf of a clover. The leaves have been used by Christians to represent hope, faith, love and luck. Others say that four-leaf clovers granted the power to see fairies, or that they are related to Saint Patrick's use of the shamrock to explain the Christian doctrine of the Holy Trinity to the Irish.

See also
Fern flower

References

Trifolium
Luck
Lucky symbols

de:Klee#Das vierblättrige Kleeblatt